Habiganj-2 is a constituency represented in the Jatiya Sangsad (National Parliament) of Bangladesh since 2008 by Abdul Majid Khan of the Awami League.

Boundaries 
The constituency encompasses Ajmiriganj and Baniachong upazilas.

History 
The constituency was created in 1984 from a Sylhet constituency when the former Sylhet District was split into four districts: Sunamganj, Sylhet, Moulvibazar, and Habiganj.

Members of Parliament

Elections

Elections in the 2010s

Elections in the 2000s

Elections in the 1990s 
Sharif Uddin Ahmed died in office. Suranjit Sengupta was elected in an October 1996 by-election.

References

External links
 

Parliamentary constituencies in Bangladesh
Habiganj District